A drawing room is a room in a house where visitors may be entertained, and an alternative name for a living room. The name is derived from the 16th-century terms withdrawing room and withdrawing chamber, which remained in use through the 17th century, and made their first written appearance in 1642. In a large 16th to early 18th century English house, a withdrawing room was a room to which the owner of the house, his wife, or a distinguished guest who was occupying one of the main apartments in the house could "withdraw" for more privacy. It was often off the great chamber (or the great chamber's descendant, the state room) and usually led to a formal, or "state" bedroom.

In modern houses, it may be used as a convenient name for a second or further reception room, but no particular function is associated with the name.

History and development
 
In 18th-century London, the royal morning receptions that the French called  levées were called "drawing rooms", with the sense originally that the privileged members of court would gather in the drawing room outside the king's bedroom, where he would make his first formal public appearance of the day.

During the American Civil War, in the White House of the Confederacy in Richmond, Virginia, the drawing room was off the parlor where CSA President Jefferson Davis greeted his guests. At the conclusion of these greetings, the men remained in the parlor to talk politics and the women withdrew to the drawing room for their own conversation. This was common practice in the affluent circles of the Southern United States. 

In 1865, an architectural manual in England defined "drawing room" in this way:

 Until the mid-twentieth century, after a dinner the ladies of a dinner party withdrew to the drawing room, leaving the gentlemen at table, where the tablecloth was removed. After an interval of conversation, often accompanied by brandy or port and sometimes cigars, the gentlemen rejoined the ladies in the drawing room.

The term drawing room is not used as widely as it once was, and tends to be used in Britain only by those who also have other reception rooms, such as a morning room, a 19th-century designation for a sitting room, often with east-facing exposure, suited for daytime calls, or the middle-class lounge, a late-19th-century designation for a room in which to relax. Hence the drawing room is the smartest room in the house, usually used by the adults of the family when entertaining. This term is widely used in India and Pakistan, probably dating from the colonial days, in the larger urban houses of the cities where there are many rooms.

The term parlour initially designated the more modest reception rooms of the middle classes, but usage changed in the UK as homeowners sought to identify with the grander homes of the wealthy.  Parlor remained the common usage in North America into the early 20th century.  In French usage the word salon, previously designating a state room, began to be used for a drawing room in the early part of the 19th century, reflecting the salon social gatherings that had become popular in the preceding decades.

Railway usage
The term drawing room was historically also applied to certain passenger train accommodations, designating some of the most spacious and expensive private accommodations available on board a sleeping car or private railroad car. An example, named as such, was a Midland Railway "Drawing Room Car" in 1874 that was made by Pullman and imported from the USA.

In North America, it meant a room which slept three or more persons, with a private washroom.  Although Amtrak has retired its sleeping cars that were built with drawing rooms, they are still used by Via Rail Canada. The traditional nomenclature is seen as archaic, hence they are marketed as "triple bedrooms".

Drawing room plays
The drawing room, being a room in the house to entertain visitors, gave its name to drawing room plays, a genre of theatrical productions and motion pictures. Beginning with the early forms of drama, the drawing room play has evolved to encompass comedy as well as to include the forms of the dramatic monologue. The play format itself has also grown out of the traditional drawing room performance and back into main street theater and film. While the drawing room itself has fallen out of favor, the play format has continued to provide a source of entertainment.

Drawing room comedy typically features wit and verbal banter among wealthy, leisured, genteel, upper class characters. Drawing room comedy is also sometimes called the "comedy of manners". Oscar Wilde's 1895 The Importance of Being Earnest and several of the plays of Noël Coward are typical works of the genre. George Bernard Shaw's 1919 Heartbreak House adds an undercurrent of social criticism to the genre. Cary Grant appeared in a number of filmed drawing-room comedies. Ernst Lubitsch was especially known as a director of drawing-room comedies.

Notes

Rooms
Theatrical genres